The 2013 Western Canada Cup was played April 26–May 5, 2013 at Nanaimo, British Columbia.  This was the first season for the Western Canada Cup, which succeeded the Anavet and Doyle Cups to decide the two western Canada entries in the Royal Bank Cup, Canada's Junior A ice hockey championship.

The Surrey Eagles (British Columbia) and Brooks Bandits (Alberta) finished first and second, respectively, and thereby qualified for the 2013 Royal Bank Cup.  The other teams competing were the Yorkton Terriers (Saskatchewan), Steinbach Pistons (Manitoba), and the host Nanaimo Clippers.

Round robin

Tie Breaker: Head-to-Head, then 3-way +/-.

Results

Semi and Finals

See also
Western Canada Cup
2013 Royal Bank Cup

References

External links
Official Website

Western Canada Cup
Western Canada Cup
Western Canada Cup
Western Canada Cup
2012–13 in Canadian ice hockey